Pomerania proper is a term used to distinguish the area of the former Prussian Province of Pomerania from Pomerelia, which is not always considered to be a part of Pomerania because of a somewhat different history.

Pomerania
Metropolitan or continental parts of states